is a Russo-Japanese tarento and a former member of the idol groups HKT48 and NMB48 represented by Twin Planet. She was in Team KIV (formerly in Team H) in HKT48.

Career 
On July 10, 2011, Murashige passed the first generation audition for HKT48. She was unveiled along with other HKT48 members on October 23. On November 26, she debuted at the HKT48 Theater. I love all of you very, very much.")

On March 4, 2012, when HKT48's Team H was formed, she was selected as one of its 16 members. On August 17, 2012, she appeared in the TV drama Majisuka Gakuen 3. She was the only HKT48 member to be in it. In June 2014 she placed 67th in the AKB48 general elections. On September 19, 2021, Murashige announced her graduation from HKT48. Her graduation performance was on December 27.

Personal life 
Murashige is the eldest of four, with two sisters and a brother. Her mother came from Russia after the dissolution of the Soviet Union to work in Japan, where she met Murashige's father, who is Japanese. Her younger sisters Maria and Erika both are child actresses affiliated to the Kyushu division of Watanabe Entertainment. Murashige has relatives living in Russia.

Murashige spoke out against the 2022 Russian invasion of Ukraine and stated "I think that war should never be done under any circumstances. I wish for early peace from Japan."

Notes

References

External links 
 

1998 births
Living people
HKT48 members
NMB48 members
Japanese idols
Japanese women singers
Japanese women pop singers
Musicians from Yamaguchi Prefecture
Japanese people of Russian descent
Universal Music Japan artists